The Songs in the Key of Life Tour was a mini date concert tour by American recording artist Stevie Wonder. The set list for the tour showcases performances of Wonder performing every song from his eighteenth studio album, Songs in the Key of Life, which coincides with the anniversary of the album's original release in September 1976.

Setlist
"Love's in Need of Love Today"
"Have a Talk with God"	ft Frédéric Yonnet
"Village Ghetto Land"	
"Contusion" 	
"Sir Duke"	
"I Wish" 	
"Knocks Me Off My Feet" 	
"Pastime Paradise"	
"Summer Soft" 	
"Ordinary Pain"
"Saturn"
"Ebony Eyes"
Intermission 
"Isn't She Lovely"	
"Joy Inside My Tears" 	
"Black Man"
"All Day Sucker"
"Easy Goin' Evening (My Mama's Call)"	ft  Frédéric Yonnet
"Ngiculela – Es Una Historia – I Am Singing"	
"If It's Magic" 	
"As"	
"Another Star"
"Superstition"

Tour dates

Grossing
2014: $13.6 million from 12 shows

2015: $28.1 million from 34 shows

Total: $41.7 million from 46 shows

References

Stevie Wonder
2014 concert tours
2015 concert tours